Carthona may refer to:

In Australia
 Carthona, Darling Point
 Carthona (Kensington)